Super Red Eagles is a Surinamese football club, which currently play in Suriname's first division. They play their home games in Paramaribo.

Achievements
Beker van Suriname: 1
 2004

References 

Football clubs in Paramaribo